The Franklin Planner is a paper-based time management system created by Richard I. Winwood first sold in 1984 by Franklin International Institute, Inc.  The planner itself is the paper component of the time management system developed by Winwood. 

The planner pages are drilled, loose-leaf style pages in different sizes and formats. Formats have been updated through the years, but most planners contain areas for an appointment schedule, prioritized daily tasks, and notes. A key section at the rear of the planner contains addresses. Other inserts include ledger sheets for tracking finances or vehicle mileage, exercise logs, and other individualized reference materials.

Winwood named his planning system after Benjamin Franklin (1706–1790) who kept a small private book, as detailed in The Autobiography of Benjamin Franklin. A core technique of the Franklin Planner system involves beginning each day with 15 minutes of "solitude and planning".

Versions 
The planner comes in four sizes:

 Monarch (8.5×11″, 216×280 mm)
 Classic (5.5×8.5″, 140×216 mm)
 Compact (4.25×6.75″,108×172 mm)
 Pocket (3.5×6″, 89×153 mm)

Functions 
Because of its overall design, the Franklin Planner system lends itself to use as a tickler file, as well as a long-range planner. Most annual versions of the page inserts for the Franklin system include yearly calendars for at least five years; future monthly calendars for at least three years; and then the current year's pages and associated monthly calendars for planning. When used as a total package, the system provides a means of tracking minute details; storage of signed agreements (especially if pages are archived in the archival binders); and tracking of business and personal expenses for taxes.

Marketing 
The Franklin Planner is marketed to consumers through an e-commerce web site, a US-based call center, and a GSA government contract. Marketing channels also exist outside the United States of America.

History 
The Franklin Day Planner was first produced in 1984 by the Franklin International Institute, Inc., which later became Franklin Quest. In 1997, Franklin Quest and the Covey Leadership Center merged to become FranklinCovey. The Franklin Planner has continued to be sold under the FranklinCovey name to this day. However, in 2008, FranklinCovey sold its Consumer Solutions Business Unit, including Franklin Planner, to a private equity firm. The parent company of the Franklin Planner is currently FC Organizational Products, LLC, which is the exclusive worldwide licensee of the FranklinCovey brand.

References

External links
 

Office equipment
Personal information managers